was a Japanese actor.

Life and career
Kawazu was born in Tokyo on 12 May 1935. While still a student at Keio University, Kawazu signed with Shochiku in 1958 and debuted in Kinoshita's The Eternal Rainbow. He became one of the studio's leading young stars, notably headlining Ōshima's Cruel Story of Youth in 1960. In later years he turned to character roles in film and television, also writing several books and establishing a reputation in calligraphy, painting, ceramics, and cooking. On 26 February 2022, he died of chronic heart failure at age 86

Selected filmography

Films

The Human Condition (1959)
Cruel Story of Youth (1960)
The River Fuefuki (1960)
A Soldier's Prayer (1960)
 The Sun's Burial (1960)
Killers on Parade (1961)
Ken (1964)
Manji (1964)
Kiri no Hata (1965)
Fighting Elegy (1966)
Curse of the Blood (1968)
Black Lizard (1968)
Genocide (1968)
Black Rose Mansion (1969) as Tsugawa
Yakuza Zessyō (1970)
Battle of Okinawa (1971)
Young Girls in Love (1986)
Godzilla vs. Mechagodzilla II (1993)
Gamera 2: Attack of Legion (1996) as Akio Nojiri
Gamera 3: The Revenge of Iris (1999) as Akio Nojiri
Number Ten Blues (2013; filmed in 1975)

Television
Taikōki (1965) as Maeda Toshiie
Wild 7 (1972–1983) as Masaru Kusanami
G-Men '75 (1979–1981) as Yoshiaki Nagumo
Akō Rōshi (1979) as Heihachi Kobayashi
Kinpachi-sensei (1980–1981) as Teacher Kamibayashi
Tokugawa Ieyasu (1983) as Shima Sakon
Hitotsu Yane no Shita (1993) as Takao Sakaki

References

External links

1935 births
2022 deaths
20th-century Japanese male actors
Japanese stage actors
Keio University alumni
Male actors from Tokyo